Angelos Vlakhos (born 1915, date of death unknown) was a Greek swimmer. He competed in the men's 4 × 200 metre freestyle relay at the 1936 Summer Olympics.

References

External links
 

1915 births
Year of death missing
Place of birth missing
Greek male swimmers
Olympic swimmers of Greece
Swimmers at the 1936 Summer Olympics
Greek male freestyle swimmers